G.O.R.A.: A Space Movie is a 2004 Turkish science-fiction comedy film, directed by Ömer Faruk Sorak, which stars Cem Yılmaz as a used carpet salesman who is abducted by aliens from the planet G.O.R.A. The film, which went on nationwide general release across Turkey on , was one of the highest grossing Turkish films of 2004 and was followed by the sequels A.R.O.G (2008) and Arif V 216 (2018). A spin-off series based on Erşan Kuneri's character was released in 2022 by Netflix.

Synopsis 
Arif (Cem Yılmaz) lives by selling carpets and fake images of U.F.O. One day, he is abducted by aliens disguised as Prince Charles along with other humans. This abduction is carried out by planet G.O.R.A's security chief Logar Trihis as a grudge for the rape of an ancestor's colleague who visited Earth in 1789. On the spaceship, Arif comes across a hologram image of Garaval who tells Arif that he can sense the Force within him (a spoof reference to Star Wars) and instructs Arif to look for him. Upon landing on G.O.R.A, Arif continues to look for opportunities to escape but repeatedly fails. He builds up a friendship with inmates Faruk and Robot-216. Robot-216 is a close confidant of Princess Ceku who was demoted to prisons by an angry Logar. It is revealed that Logar plans to usurp the throne by marrying Princess Ceku despite her stubborn refusal. To carry out his plan, he sets a fireball towards G.O.R.A and asks for the Princess's hand as the reward on the condition that he will save G.O.R.A. The king has to agree as the alternative option of using sacred stone is hindered by the absence of the manual (the manual is stolen by Logar). But when Logar fails to fire-off his weapon, Arif comes to the rescue by performing the sacred stone ritual which resembles scene from The Fifth Element film Arif saw. Logar is furious as it required Arif to kiss Ceku. So, he blackmails the king into agreeing Ceku's marriage with him. However, Ceku learns from her mother that her original father is in fact an earthling. She sets off to find him with Arif, Faruk and Robot-216. But along the way, Logar's men intercept and take Ceku back. At the same time, Arif meets Garavel who is an old acquaintance of Ceku's father, who is revealed to have been a Turkish Air Force pilot who was abducted in 1978. With his help, Arif gains power-ups and invades the castle to rescue Ceku. In a move spoofing The Matrix, Arif defeats Logar and exposes his sinister plans to everybody. Arif and Ceku, very much in love, return to Earth and lives off as a couple. The film ends with the couple happily driving on a highway.

Cast
 Cem Yılmaz – Arif Işık/Commander Logar Trihis
 Rasim Öztekin – Bob Marley Faruk
 Özkan Uğur – Garavel
 İdil Fırat – Mulu
 Şafak Sezer – Kuna
 Özge Özberk – Princess Ceku Lamtschina
 Erdal Tosun – Rendroy
 Ozan Güven – 216-Robot
 Cezmi Baskın – Superior Tocha

Reception

Reviews 
Todd Brown, writing for Twitch Film, describes the film as, "a very funny, very Mel Brooks inspired sci-fi comedy", with "some pitch perfect knocks on both Star Wars and The Matrix films in there" that "looked good...went on to become a huge hit in its native country", and "re-introduced Turkish genre film to international audiences as it rolled out on the festival circuit", proving that Turkey "was capable of producing big, glossy productions with the very best of them".

References

External links
 
 

2004 films
Films set in Turkey
2000s Turkish-language films
2000s science fiction comedy films
2000s parody films
Turkish science fiction comedy films
Space adventure films
Films scored by Ozan Çolakoğlu